The Capt. Alexander A. Arnold Farm is located in Galesville, Wisconsin. The farm is located near U.S. Route 53 across from Gale / Ettrick / Trempealeau High School at 19408 Silver Creek Road. The farm once belonged to Speaker of the Assembly and State Senator Alexander Ahab Arnold. He designed and built the farm along with Samuel Luce. Arnold used the farm to raise shorthorn cattle. At the time, the  lot held a two-story farmhouse with 15 rooms and a New York-style barn. The farmhouse is a brick structure. It was added to the National Register of Historic Places in 1978. 

In 1983, the community formed an organization to restore the farm called the Garden of Eden Preservation Society. As of 2018, it continues work on the project. It is open for tours on Sundays in June, July and August.

Gallery

References

External links
National Register of Historic Places nomination form

Buildings and structures in Trempealeau County, Wisconsin
Farms on the National Register of Historic Places in Wisconsin
Italianate architecture in Wisconsin
National Register of Historic Places in Trempealeau County, Wisconsin